Pontiac station could refer to:

 Pontiac station (Illinois), a train station in Pontiac, Illinois, United States
 Pontiac Transportation Center, a train station in Pontiac, Michigan, United States